Charymurat Kurbanov (born 12.05.1977) is a Turkmenian professional football referee. He has been a full international for FIFA since 2003. and has refereed in some AFC Cup and AFC Champions League matches. Head of the technical department of the Football Federation of Turkmenistan. He is fluent in Turkmen, English and Russian. Graduated National Institute of Sports and Tourism of Turkmenistan in 1994.

References 

1977 births
Living people
Turkmenistan football referees
People from Ashgabat